East Boyer Township is a township in Crawford County, Iowa, USA. At the 2000 census, its population was 424.

Geography
According to the USGS, it contains one cemetery, Old Catholic.

The streams of Hay Creek, Rocky Run and Walnut Creek run through the township.

References

External links
 East Boyer township, Crawford County, Iowa (IA) detailed profile at City-Data

Townships in Crawford County, Iowa
Townships in Iowa